The 2022 SWAC women's basketball tournament (officially known as the Cricket Wireless SWAC Basketball Tournament due to sponsorship reasons) was the postseason women's basketball tournament for the 2021–22 season in the Southwestern Athletic Conference (SWAC). The tournament was held from March 9 to 12, 2022. The tournament winner will receive an automatic invitation to the 2022 NCAA Division I women's basketball tournament.

Seeds 
Teams are seeded by record within the conference, with a tie–breaker system to seed teams with identical conference records. Only the top eight teams in the conference qualify for the tournament.

Schedule

Bracket

References 

2021–22 Southwestern Athletic Conference women's basketball season
SWAC women's basketball tournament
Basketball competitions in Birmingham, Alabama
College basketball tournaments in Alabama
SWAC women's basketball tournament
SWAC women's basketball tournament
Women's sports in Alabama